Eva Kahana is an American sociologist.

Career 
Kahana is the Pierce T. and Elizabeth D Robson Professor of Humanities, Chair of the Department of Sociology, and the Director of the Elderly Care Research Center at Case Western Reserve University. She has published over 200 academic articles on Holocaust survivors, aging, and stressors.

Awards and honors 
Kahana is a Fellow of the Gerontological Society of America and is the recipient of its Polisher and Distinguished Mentorship awards. She has also received the Mary E. Switzer Distinguished Fellow of the National Institute on Disability, Independent Living, and Rehabilitation Research, the 1977 Distinguished Scholar Award from the Aging and Life Course of the American Sociological Association and Menorah Park's Heller Award. She was in the Cleveland Jewish News 2016 class of 18 difference makers.

Personal life 
Kahana is married to psychologist Boaz Kahana. Kahana and her mother Holocaust survivors who later migrated to the United States. She has two sons. Kahana attends Green Road Synagogue in Cleveland, Ohio.

Selected works

Books

References

External links
 

Fellows of the Gerontological Society of America
Living people
Year of birth missing (living people)
Case Western Reserve University faculty
20th-century American women writers
21st-century American women writers
20th-century American educators
21st-century American educators
American women social scientists
American sociologists
American women sociologists
Holocaust survivors
Jewish American social scientists
Jewish sociologists
Jews and Judaism in Cleveland
Jewish women scientists
21st-century American women scientists
20th-century American women scientists
21st-century American Jews